Rondonops is a genus of lizards in the family Gymnophthalmidae. The genus is endemic to Brazil.

Species
The genus Rondonops contains 2 species which are recognized as being valid.
Rondonops biscutatus   
Rondonops xanthomystax 

Nota bene: A binomial authority in parentheses indicates that the species was originally described in a genus other than Rondonops.

References

 
Lizards of South America
Taxa named by Guarino R. Colli
Taxa named by Marinus Steven Hoogmoed
Taxa named by David C. Cannatella
Taxa named by José Cassimiro
Taxa named by Jerriane O. Gomes
Taxa named by Jose Mario B. Ghellere
Taxa named by Pedro M. Sales-Nunes
Taxa named by Kátia Cristina Machado Pellegrino
Taxa named by Patricia E. Salerno
Taxa named by Sergio M. Souza
Taxa named by Miguel Trefaut Rodrigues